Jón Helgason may refer to:

 Jón Helgason (poet) (1899–1986), Icelandic philologist and poet
 Jón Helgason (minister) (1931–2019), Icelandic politician and former minister